The Slovenian Ladies Open was a women's professional golf tournament on the Ladies European Tour that took place in Slovenia.

Winners

^Shortened from 54-holes

See also
BTC Slovenian Open – men's Challenge Tour event played at the same venue

References

External links
Ladies European Tour

Former Ladies European Tour events
Golf tournaments in Slovenia